Aberdeen Beach and Queens Links is located in Aberdeen, Scotland. The beach itself is famous for its golden sand and its long curved length between Aberdeen Harbour and the River Don's mouth.

The beach suffers from significant erosion of the sand so there are distinctive groyne or walls, to help keep the sand in place. The beach is popular with walkers, surfers and windsurfers.

Recently in an expensive million pound operation, sand was taken by ship from further down the coast to the south of Aberdeen and sprayed on the beach to replace some of the lost sand. Rocks were then placed in a v-shape formation to try to prevent erosion, much like the groyne.

The actual park area is called Queens Links and takes the form of a large grassy area parallel to the beach. It is popular with many people and often kite-boarders can be seen taking advantage of the strong sea winds. There is a public golf course, the Kings Links.

History 
An indoor baths, or bathing station, was located here opposite the Beach Ballroom. It operated from 1898 to 1972 and was subsequently demolished.

Attractions
Queens Links Leisure Park is situated in the area and contains several shops, restaurants, and a 9-screen Cineworld cinema (originally branded under Virgin Cinemas). Adjacent to the leisure park is Codona's Amusement Park. Further north along the boulevard is the Beach Ballroom and the adjacent Beach Leisure Centre, which contains a swimming pool, and the Linx Ice Arena. The area is also home to Transition Extreme.

The Beach Boulevard retail park is located here. It was purchased from Abrdn by Realty Income in February 2022.

Transportation 

Aberdeen Corporation Tramways previously operated a line to the Queen's Links. The area is now accessible by bus. Previously, the beach, Footdee, and the retail park were served by a loop on route 15. In July 2022, bus routes were changed such that the beach and Footdee are no longer served by bus. Route 13 now calls at the Beach Retail Park.

The Beach Esplanade runs along the coast from Queen's Links in the south to Kings Street in the north. In August 2020, a cycle lane was installed on the beach esplanade with funding from the Scottish Government's Spaces for People initiative. However, Aberdeen City Council removed the cycle lane in December 2020.

See also
Green spaces and walkways in Aberdeen

References

External links
Queens Links Leisure Park
Beach Boulevard Retail Park

Parks in Aberdeen
Environment of Aberdeen